Earls Colne Airfield  is a general aviation aerodrome located south-east of the village of Earls Colne, Essex, England.

The site was previously RAF Earls Colne, a Royal Air Force station which was primilarly used by the United States Army Air Forces.

History

The following units were here at some point:
 No. 38 Group Communication Flight RAF (October 1944 - May 1946)
 No. 296 Squadron RAF between 29 September 1944 and 23 January 1946 using Armstrong Whitworth Albemarle I, V, & VI and the Handley Page Halifax V, III & A.7
 No. 297 Squadron RAF between 30 September 1944 and 1 April 1946 using Albemarle I, II, V & VI and the Halifax V, III & A.7
 94th Bombardment Group
 323d Bombardment Group
 331st Bombardment Squadron
 332nd Bombardment Squadron
 333rd Bombardment Squadron
 410th Bombardment Squadron
 453rd Bombardment Squadron
 454th Bombardment Squadron
 455th Bombardment Squadron
 456th Bombardment Squadron

Post war

The following companies were here at some point:
 Anglian Flight Centres
 Bulldog Aviation
 Essex Air Ambulance
 Essex Flying School
 Herts Air Ambulance

See also
 List of former Royal Air Force stations

References

Citations

Bibliography

Earls Colne